Polylogism is the belief that different groups of people reason in fundamentally different ways (coined from Greek poly 'many' + logos 'logic'). The term is attributed to Ludwig von Mises, who claimed that it described Marxism and other social philosophies. In the Misesian sense of the term, a polylogist ascribes different forms of "logic" to different groups, which may include groups based on race, gender, class, or time period.

Types of polylogism

A polylogist would claim that different groups reason in fundamentally different ways: they use different "logics" for deductive inference. Normative polylogism is the claim that these different logics are equally valid. Descriptive polylogism is an empirical claim about different groups, but a descriptive polylogism need not claim equal validity for different "logics". That is, a descriptive polylogist may insist on a universally valid deductive logic while claiming as an empirical matter that some groups use other (incorrect) reasoning strategies.

An adherent of polylogism in the Misesian sense would be a normative polylogist.  A normative polylogist might approach an argument by demonstrating how it was correct within a particular logical construct, even if it were incorrect within the logic of the analyst. As Mises noted "this never has been and never can be attempted by anybody."

Proletarian logic

The term 'proletarian logic' is sometimes taken as evidence of polylogism. This term is usually traced back to Joseph Dietzgen in his 11th letter on logic. Dietzgen is the now obscure philosophical monist of the 19th century who coined the term 'dialectical materialism' and was praised by communist figures such as Karl Marx and V. I. Lenin.  His work has received modern attention primarily from the philosopher Bertell Ollman.  As a monist, Dietzgen insists on a unified treatment of mind and matter. As Simon Boxley puts it, for Dietzgen "thought is as material an event as any other". This means that logic too has "material" underpinnings. (But note that Dietzgen's "materialism" was explicitly not a physicalism.)

Racialist polylogism
Racialist polylogism is often identified with the Nazi era.  It has been proposed that the ferment around Einstein's theory of relativity is an example of racialist polylogism. Some of the criticisms of relativity theory were mixed with racialist resistance that characterized the physics as an embodiment of Jewish ideology. (For example, Nobel Prize winner Philipp Lenard claimed scientific thought was conditioned by "blood and race", and he accused Werner Heisenberg of teaching "Jewish physics".) However this appears to be an argument ad hominem, not polylogism. Modern examples of supposed racialist polylogism are generally misleading. For example, US Supreme Court Justice Sotomayor has been accused of racialist polylogism for suggesting that a "wise Latina" might come to different legal conclusions than a white male. Although generally given the interpretation that life experience can influence one's ability to understand the practical implications of a legal argument, some commentators suggested that Sotomayor supported the idea that Latinas have a unique "logic".

References

 Boxley, Simon, (2008), Red, Black and Green: Dietzgen's Philosophy Across the Divide. http://www.anarchist-studies-network.org.uk/documents/Conference%20Papers/Simon%20Boxley.doc
 Ollman, B. (1976) Alienation: Marx's Conception of Man in Capitalist Society, Cambridge: Cambridge University Press
 Ollman, B. (2003a) Dance of the Dialectic: Steps in Marx's Method, Chicago: University of Illinois Press
 Ollman, B. (2003b) ‘Marx’s Dialectical Method is more than a Mode of Exposition: A Critique of Systematic Dialectics’ in Albritton, R. & Siloulidis, J. (Eds.) New Dialectics and Political Economy, Basingstoke: Palgrave Macmillan
 Perrin, Pierre, "Hermeneutic economics: Between relativism and progressive polylogism", Quarterly Journal of Austrian Economics, Volume 8, Number 3, 21–38,

External links 
 Theory and History by Ludwig von Mises, for an exposition.

Theories of deduction
Austrian School